are square or rectangular cooking pans used to make Japanese-style rolled omelettes. The pans are commonly made from metals such as copper and tin, and can also be coated with a non-stick surface. Dimensions and proportions of the pan vary among regions of Japan, but it is always rectangular.

Etymology 
Occasionally, the implement is simply referred to as a Japanese omelette pan. The terms  and  both refer to the rolled omelettes that are typically made with the pan, with  meaning "implement" in the former phrase.

Design and use 
The rectangular shape of the pan facilitates a constant diameter over the length of the omelette, giving the omelette its bar-like shape once rolled. Most professional pans are made of heavy copper coated or lined with tin, with these materials being preferred for their heat conduction. A cheaper, nonstick variety is a common alternative to the copper pan. There are three types of : Kantō-type, Kansai-type, and Nagoya-type. Kantō-type pans are square, Kansai-type pans are tall-and-thin rectangles, and Nagoya-type pans are short-and-wide rectangles. In the Kantō region,  is typically used with a thick wooden lid that is used to help flip the omelette.

A  dish starts as a single layer of rectangular omelette, but before it fully cooks and sets, it is folded over perhaps a third of a way onto itself by picking up a flap by the edge using Japanese kitchen chopsticks; the doubled layer is flipped onto the remaining sheet. More of the beaten egg mixture is added, and the flipping/ rolling process is repeated. The finished product is a rectangular block of layered omelette.

The pan must be slicked with only a very thin coating of oil. To achieve this, the pan is wiped with a paper towel or piece of cloth daubed with oil. A piece of absorbent cotton ball (or cotton pad) is also sometimes utilised for this purpose.

Some recipes caution that the egg should not be allowed to brown at all, but this depends on the type of omelette, in other recipes the egg is allowed to turn golden-brown on its layers. Among the  stalls formerly at the Tsukiji Market, there are offerings with slight  or browning on them.

Tamagoyaki 

Some sushi chefs make versions of the omelette using eggs mixed with shrimp paste and grated  (a cultivar of the Chinese yam Dioscorea polystachya); this thick mixture is not cooked in layers but poured entirely up to the brim of the pan, cooked for perhaps 30 minutes, then flipped so the top and bottom are caramelized to a brown color and the omelette remains yellow and pliable within.

Varieties of the omelette depend on its thickness. Thinner varieties are used as garnishes or as wrappers which are formed into pouches that are filled with sushi rice. When shredded and used as a garnish, the omelette is called , or golden thread egg.

Tamagoyaki can be eaten as a snack, side dish, or breakfast food. The omelettes are a common inclusion in bentō boxes.

See also 

List of Japanese cooking utensils – utensils of similar Japanese origin

Explanatory notes

References 
Citations

Bibliography

Japanese food preparation utensils
Omelettes
Food preparation utensils
Cookware and bakeware